Balbino Jaramillo (15 May 1951 – 7 May 2013) was a Colombian cyclist. He competed in the individual pursuit and points race events at the 1984 Summer Olympics.

References

External links
 

1951 births
2013 deaths
Colombian male cyclists
Olympic cyclists of Colombia
Cyclists at the 1984 Summer Olympics
Place of birth missing
Pan American Games medalists in cycling
Pan American Games gold medalists for Colombia
Cyclists at the 1975 Pan American Games
Medalists at the 1975 Pan American Games
20th-century Colombian people